Kelthoum Arbi Aouda (born 25 September 1987) is an Algerian footballer who plays as a defender for Afak Relizane and the Algeria women's national team.

Club career
Arbi Aouda has played for Afak Relizane in Algeria.

International career
Arbi Aouda capped for Algeria at senior level during the 2021 Arab Women's Cup.

Personal life
Arbi Aouda is Muslim, wearing hijab even during her international football matches.

References

External links

1987 births
Living people
Algerian women's footballers
Women's association football defenders
Algeria women's international footballers
Algerian Muslims
21st-century Algerian people